The 2007 NAB Cup was the pre-season competition of the Australian Football League's 2007 season. It culminated in the Grand Final on 17 March, which was won by Carlton.

Prize money 
 Winner: $220,000
 Runner-up: $110,000
 Round 3 losers: $55,000
 Round 2 losers: $27,000
 Round 1 losers: $16,500

$220,000 was awarded to the winning club (by comparison, the prize money for the winner of the 2005 AFL Grand Final was only slightly larger at $250,000). Smaller amounts were awarded to clubs based on participation and progression through the competition.

It was announced that if a club could win both the pre-season and regular premierships in the same season, that the club would receive a bonus $1 million. Half would be distributed among the players, while the other half would go to the club.

Games

Round 1

Round 2

Round 3

Grand Final

Summary of results

See also
2007 AFL season

References

Australian Football League pre-season competition
Nab Cup, 2007
NAB Cup